Amos 5 is the fifth chapter of the Book of Amos in the Hebrew Bible or the Old Testament of the Christian Bible. This book contains the prophecies attributed to the prophet Amos, including a lamentation for Israel, Amos 5:1–3; an exhortation to repentance, Amos 5:4–20; and God's rejection of their hypocritical service, Amos 5:21–27. It is a part of the Book of the Twelve Minor Prophets.

Text
The original text was written in Hebrew language. This chapter is divided into 27 verses.

Textual witnesses
Some early manuscripts containing the text of this chapter in Hebrew are of the Masoretic Text tradition, which includes the Codex Cairensis (895), the Petersburg Codex of the Prophets (916), Aleppo Codex (10th century), and Codex Leningradensis (1008).

Fragments containing parts of this chapter were found among the Dead Sea Scrolls, including 4Q82 (4QXIIg; 25 BCE) with extant verses 1–2, 9–18.

There is also a translation into Koine Greek known as the Septuagint, made in the last few centuries BCE. Extant ancient manuscripts of the Septuagint version include the Codex Vaticanus (B; B; 4th century), Codex Alexandrinus (A; A; 5th century), and Codex Marchalianus (Q; Q; 6th century).

Structure
NKJV groups this chapter into:
 = A Lament for Israel
 = A Call to Repentance
 = The Day of the Lord

Verse 24

  But let justice roll down as waters,
 and righteousness as a mighty stream.
Dr. Martin Luther King Jr. cited this verse in his memorable "I Have a Dream" speech (August 28, 1963 in Washington, D.C.).

Verse 26
 But ye have borne the tabernacle of your Moloch
 and Chiun your images, the star of your god,
 which ye made to yourselves.

Verse 26 in Hebrew
Masoretic text:
ונשאתם את סכות מלככם ואת כיון צלמיכם כוכב אלהיכם אשר עשיתם לכם׃
Transliteration:

Verse 26 notes
 "But ye have borne": Literally, "And ye bare the tabernacle of your Moloch" (literally, "your king," from where the idol Moloch had its name.) He declares the reason why he denied that they had sacrificed to God in the wilderness. "Did ye offer sacrifices unto Me, and ye bare?" The two were incompatible. Since they did "carry about the tabernacle of their king," they did not really worship God. He whom they chose as "their king" was their god.
 "The tabernacle of your Moloch": τὴν σκηνὴν τοῦ Μολόχ (Septuagint); tabernaculum Moloch vestro (Vulgate). The Hebrew word rendered "tabernacle" (sikkuth), which is found nowhere else, has been explained in a variety of ways. Aquila gives συσκιασμούς: Theodotion, "vision," reading the whole sentence thus: Καὶ ἤρατε τὴν ὅρασιν τοῦ Θεοῦ ὑμῶν ὑμῶν ἄστρον τοῦ Θεοῦ ὑμῶν. Many moderns render this as "stake," "column," or "shrine." Others suppose it to be equivalent to Sakkuth, an Assyrian name for Molech (or Adar), but this is uncertain (see 'Studien und Kritiken.' 1874, p. 887). The parallelism requires the word to be an appellative and not a proper name. The Syriac and Arabic versions call it a "tent," and thus the reproach stands forth emphatically that, instead of, or in conjunction with, the true tabernacle, they bore aloft, as if proud of their apostasy, the tabernacle of a false god. Such shrines were used by the Egyptians, according to Herodotus (2:63; see Rawlinson's note) and Diod. Sic. (1:97). Many such shrines may be seen in the Egyptian room of the British Museum. Keil quotes Drumann, 'On the Rosetta Inscription,' p. 211, "These were small chapels, generally gilded and ornamented with flowers and in other ways, intended to hold a small idol when processions were made, and to be carried or driven about with it." Hence, Egypt was likely the source of this idolatry.
 "The star of your god": R. Isaac Caro says all the astrologers represented Saturn as the star of Israel. There may have been a star on the head of the image of the idol to represent the planet Saturn. Hence, the "images" correspond to the "star" in the parallel clause. A star in hieroglyphs represents God . "Images" are either a Hebraism for "image," or refer to the many images made to represent Chiun.
 "Chiun": This is the same with "Chevan", which in the Arabic and Persic languages is the name of "Saturn", as noted by Aben Ezra and Kimchi . It is so rendered by Montanus . In Egyptian, it was called Revan, Rephan, or Remphan . It is this sense of the word that is used in :  "the cake of your images". In Jeremiah, it is supposed that the "cake" had the image of the gods impressed upon it. Calmet interprets it as "the pedestal of your images",  and others have also translated it this way. The term is applicable to Moloch (Mo) "their king", a king being the basis and foundation of the kingdom and people, and to the sun, often seen as a deity. Some take Mo and Chiun to be distinct deities, the one to be the sun, and the other the moon. However, they seem to be the same, and both to be the Egyptian ox and the calf of the Israelites in the wilderness. These types of image were carried in portable tents or tabernacles, in chests or shrines (such as the Succothbenoth, or tabernacles of Venus, ; and those of Diana's).

Verse 27
 Therefore will I cause you to go into captivity beyond Damascus,
 saith the Lord, whose name is The God of hosts.
This verse plays an important role in the Damascus Document, an important Essene text from among the Dead Sea Scrolls.

See also

Related Bible parts: Job 9, Job 38, Amos 3, Amos 4

Notes

References

Sources

External links

Jewish
Amos 5 Hebrew with Parallel English
Amos 5 Hebrew with Rashi's Commentary

Christian
Amos 5 English Translation with Parallel Latin Vulgate

 
05